Cussac is a commune in the Cantal department in the Auvergne region in south-central France.

History
On August 29, 1967, two young siblings (François, 13 years old and Anne-Marie, 9 years old) claimed to have been the witnesses of a close encounter with a UFO and its occupants; the incident is now known as the close encounter of Cussac.

Population

See also
Communes of the Cantal department
Close encounter of Cussac

References

Communes of Cantal
Cantal communes articles needing translation from French Wikipedia